Silver Dagger can refer to:

Silver Dagger (song), American folk ballad
Silver Dagger (award), Crime Writers' Association Award
Silver Daggers, experimental music group 
Silver Dagger (comics), Marvel Comics character
Silver Dagger, character from Samit Basu's GameWorld Trilogy
Silver dagger, mercenaries in the fantasy novel trilogy Deverry Cycle